Jaspidella is a genus of sea snails, marine gastropod mollusks in the family Bellolividae.

Species
Species within the genus Jaspidella include:

 Jaspidella blanesi (Ford, 1898)
 Jaspidella carminae Petuch, 1992
 Jaspidella jaspidea (Gmelin, 1791)
 Jaspidella mirris Olsson, 1956

References

Bellolividae